The Mahindra Axe is a Light Military Utility Tactical Vehicle designed by Mahindra & Mahindra. Prototypes of the vehicle were customized to meet Indian Army specifications, but after evaluating the vehicles the Indian Army decided not to place an order.

The vehicle was meant to be marketed to the Indian Army and special forces units.

Design
Axe is built on a new platform, derived from existing Mahindra models. According to Brigadier Khutub A Hai, CEO, Mahindra Defence Systems, "The Axe was designed with help from an overseas designer".

Current Axe variants use either a diesel engine (a 2.7 L Mercedes derived Ssangyong engine, which powers the Rexton) or a petrol engine (using 4 L GM Vortec engine, which powers the Chevrolet TrailBlazer).

Fuel efficiency
According to Mahindra, the diesel Axe offers around 8 to 9 km/L (11.1 to 12.5 L/100 km) while the petrol Axe offers 6 to 7 km/L (14.3 to 16.6 L/100 km).

Variants
Mahindra planned to launch a civilian version of the Axe, but a civilian launch is now very much in doubt.

See also 
 Mahindra Armored Light Specialist Vehicle

References 

Axe
Military vehicles of India
Military light utility vehicles